Magnus Smelhus Sjøeng (born 23 March 2002) is a Norwegian footballer who plays as a goalkeeper for Vålerenga Fotball.

Career
Sjøeng became Vålerenga's reserve goalkeeper after Kristoffer Klaesson was sold in 2021.
He made his debut for the Vålerenga first team on 29 June 2022 against FK Bodø/Glimt in the 2022 Norwegian Football Cup after first choice goalkeeper Kjetil Haug was signed by Toulouse during the European summer transfer window. He made his Eliteserien debut the following match on 10 July, 2022 in a 3-0 victory against Kristiansund BK at the Intility Arena.

International career
Sjøeng was capped on U19 and U20 level in 2021. He was called up to the Norwegian under-21 squad for the first time in May 2022.

References

2002 births
Living people
Norwegian footballers
Norway youth international footballers
Vålerenga Fotball players
Eliteserien players
Association football goalkeepers